Why Is Sex Fun? The Evolution of Human Sexuality is a 1997 book about the evolution of human sexuality by the biologist Jared Diamond.

Summary

Diamond addresses aspects of human sexuality such as why women's ovulation is not overtly advertised (concealed ovulation); why humans have sex in private rather than in public like other mammals; and why the ovaries are U-shaped.

The book is divided into 7 chapters:

 The Animal With the Weirdest Sex Life: Diamond proposes that human sexuality is among the most unique of all mammals. He gives the following points:
 Most men and women end up in long-term pair relationships ("marriage"). The couple has sex mainly or exclusively with each other. On the other hand, most animals live solitary lives and mate only to reproduce.
 Marriage is also a partnership for joint rearing of resulting babies. Human males and females both commonly provide parental care. This is in contrast to most mammals, where the female alone takes care of the child.
 Human couples don't live in an exclusive territory (like gibbons), they live embedded in society and cooperate with other couples economically.
 Marriage partners usually have sex in private, unlike most animals.
 Human ovulation is concealed. Therefore, most human sex is recreational rather than for reproduction. There are very few animals (bonobos and dolphins for example) who show this phenomenon.
 All women who live past the age of forty or fifty undergo menopause, a complete shut down of fertility.
 The Battle of Sexes: Male and female reproductive interests, more often than not, do not coincide. While both of them want to further their spread of genes, who wins is decided by three factors:
Parental Investment: Females, in general, invest much more than the male. This is especially true for mammals where females, apart from making costly eggs, go through periods of pregnancy and lactation.
 Alternative Opportunities foreclosed by Child Care: By their nature, women require a one- to two year long gap between pregnancies. Men, on the other hand, have no such hindrances. In theory, one man can impregnate all the fertile women on the planet in months. Most men commit themselves to child care primarily because the human baby is very vulnerable and it is very hard to rear one by the female alone. However, this is not true for all animals. There are exceptions like orangutans and giraffes where males make no investment and phalaropes and Spotted Sandpipers, where the male does all the child care.
 Confidence in Parenthood: Women are assured of their parenthood of the child they are rearing, whereas men could not have the same certainty before the advent of DNA testing.
 Why Don't Men Breastfeed Their Babies: The author proposes that men have almost all the physiological traits necessary for lactation, but thus far evolution hasn't necessitated it. He also proposes that such a scene might be common in the future.
 Wrong Time For Love (Recreational Sex): Sex is risky and costly. Why then do human beings, unlike most animals, have recreational sex just for fun? Diamond says there are two theories to explain: "Many-fathers" theory says that concealed ovulation allows women to have sex with many men and create paternity confusion, which then decreases the chances of infanticide. "Daddy-at-home" theory says that women entice men to be around, provide and protect, by allowing them to have sex regularly. By combining both, we reach the conclusion that concealed ovulation arose at a time when our ancestors were promiscuous to avoid infanticide ("many fathers theory") but once concealed ovulation evolved, the women chose monogamous relationships with more dependable cave-men ("daddy-at-home theory").
 What Are Men Good For: By studying the societies of New Guinea and Ache, the author questioned men's contributions to child-care. One argument is protection, but most often that protection is from other men of a different or same tribe. Another argument is providing food and resources. But as studies of the above-mentioned societies have shown, men on average bring lesser calories by trying to hunt down large animals than what women bring by simply picking up fruits and vegetables. The author classifies men into two categories: "providers" who actually bring food supply to the family, and "show-offs" who try to hunt down big animals and mostly come home empty handed. A woman is much better off marrying a "provider", but "show-offs" often enjoy higher social status.
 Making More by Making Less (Menopause): Menopause makes no sense from an evolutionary perspective. Why would a woman suddenly become infertile, and then remain so for a large part of her life? The author proposes that it is a trade-off. The woman chooses to rear her already born children rather than risk bringing another one to life in such an age. She may also care for her grandchildren at such a point. Moreover, older people in traditional societies provide value in the form of knowledge and wisdom.
 Truth in Advertising (Secondary Sexual Characteristics): There are many theories that explain secondary sexual characteristics:
Fisher's Runaway Selection Model: Females get attracted to a particular trait that actually supports survival, males of the species grow more and more of that trait until it becomes useless and counter-evolutionary forces act on it. Male muscles might be an example. The length of penis can also be a good example, though this theory is controversial. In this case, the counter-evolutionary force would be the length of vagina.
Zahavi's Handicap Theory: Proposes that these signals actually handicap the individual; when the opposite sex looks at their success despite the handicap, they are assured that they are not faking it. The peacock's tail is one example. In human societies, status symbols like fancy clothes and cars might be an example. Beautiful faces are also an example as faces are extremely vulnerable.
 Truth-in-Advertising Theory: Similar to Zahavi's theory, but it views signals as an evolutionary advantage rather than a handicap.

Some signals are genuinely beneficial like certain muscles in males and fat breasts/ hips in females, while some mean nothing like pitch of voice, hair, etc. The author proposes that fat deposits in a woman's body are concentrated in breasts and hips as an indication to men that the woman has better lactation abilities and a larger birth canal.

Publication history
Why Is Sex Fun? was published in 1997 by Basic Books, as part of the Science Masters series.

Reception
Why Is Sex Fun? received a positive review from the biologist Steve Jones in The New York Review of Books. Jones described the book as engaging and interesting. However, he questioned Diamond's treatment of concealed ovulation, finding it inconclusive.

The anthropologist Peter B. Gray and the evolutionary biologist Justin R. Garcia maintained that Why Is Sex Fun? was one of the best-read books on human sexuality. However, they considered it "informative but too thin in substance".

References

Bibliography
Books

 
 

Journals

External links
 Review by Steve Jones

1997 non-fiction books
Basic Books books
Biology books
Books about evolutionary psychology
English-language books
Non-fiction books about sexuality
Works by Jared Diamond